Zachary Selden is an American educator, author, and diplomat who served as the Deputy Secretary General for Policy at the NATO Parliamentary Assembly from 2008 to 2011. Selden is now an associate professor at the University of Florida.

Selden has also worked as an analyst in the Congressional Budget Office and as the Director of Defense and Security Committee of the NATO Parliamentary Assembly.

Selden is an author on American national security, European affairs, and NATO. Selden has been a researcher and commentator on NATO expansion during different parts of his career. Selden has commented or been interviewed in different outlets across the United States and Europe on NATO expansion since the 2022 Russian invasion of Ukraine.

Books 

 Foreign Policy Failure in the White House: Reappraising the Fall of the Shah and the Iran-Contra Affair (1993), University Press of America, ISBN 9780819190765 (Co-Author)
 Economic Sanctions as Instruments of American Foreign Policy (1999), Praeger, ISBN 9780275963873 (Author)
 NATO Burdensharing After Enlargement (2003), University of Michigan Press, ISBN 9780472130009 (Co-Author)
 Alignment, Alliance, and American Grand Strategy (2016), University of Michigan Press, ISBN 9780472130009 (Author)

References 

University of Florida faculty
Living people
Year of birth missing (living people)
University of California, Los Angeles alumni
American political commentators
American diplomats
American diplomat stubs
American political scientists
American political writers
American political writer stubs